Lepipaschia is a genus of snout moths. It was described by Jay C. Shaffer and Maria Alma Solis in 1994.

Species
 Lepipaschia inornata J. C. Shaffer & Solis, 1994
 Lepipaschia limbata J. C. Shaffer & Solis, 1994

References

Epipaschiinae
Pyralidae genera